Soldiers from the U.S. 1st Armored Division's 3rd Brigade Combat Team struck at insurgent elements in the Al Mansor district on the west side of Baghdad on 7 December 2003, according to U.S. Central Command officials.

Operation Details
The operation, part of Task Force 1st Armored Division's Operation "Iron Justice," included 3rd Brigade units, attack helicopters, military police elements, and 300 Iraqi Civil Defense Corps guardsmen.

More than 1,200 apartments in 36 buildings and 52 other structures were scoured for suspected insurgent forces and criminals, illegal weapons, bomb making materials and propaganda from the former regime.

Soldiers detained 43 people, six suspected of attacking Coalition Forces with improvised explosive devices (IEDs), three of firing mortars at Coalition installations, and two were apprehended for rocket-propelled grenade attacks. Twenty-three people were detained for weapons law violations and 11 for interfering with Coalition operations. One suspected arms dealer was detained.

Military Police from the 709th Military Police Company detained three suspected members of a cell responsible for recent attacks in the district and at local market places.

The operation netted 215 illegal AK-47 assault rifles, 10 other types of military rifles, four machineguns, one shotgun, various weapons parts, nine assorted pistols and 10 hand grenades. An undetermined amount of ammunition, including some armor-piercing rounds, was also confiscated. Soldiers also seized 10 rocket-propelled grenade launcher sights, 12 mortar sights, a Soviet-made night vision device and four mortar aiming stakes. In addition to the weapons, the operation netted assorted electronic components, which could be used in making IEDs, three chemical protective masks, 24 individual body armor plates, assorted Saddam Hussein paraphernalia and 16 cases of U.S. meals ready-to-eat (MREs).

During the operation, a community resident tipped off the soldiers to the location of a weapons cache. Military Police found a bag of rocket-propelled grenade propellant, eight mortar fuses and 225 hand grenade fuses.

1st Armored Division's Operation Iron Justice is ongoing and will continue to target criminal and enemy elements in the Baghdad area.

Participating Units

American Units
1st Armored Division's 3rd Brigade Combat Team

Iraqi Units
Iraqi Civil Defense Corps guardsmen

See also

War related Articles
Iraq War
List of coalition military operations of the Iraq War

Iraq Related Articles
Iraq
History of Iraq

Terrorism, Bombings and Insurgency Related
Terrorism
Iraq Insurgency
List of bombings during the Iraq War

Casualties
United States military casualties of war
Post-traumatic stress disorder
Iraq Body Count project
Violence against academics in post-invasion Iraq

External links
Defend America News

Military operations of the Iraq War involving the United States
Military operations of the Iraq War in 2003
Iraqi insurgency (2003–2011)